Stephen Angers (born 29 April 1965) is a Canadian fencer. He competed in the individual and team foil events at the 1988 Summer Olympics.

References

External links
 

1965 births
Living people
Canadian male fencers
Olympic fencers of Canada
Fencers at the 1988 Summer Olympics
Fencers from Montreal
Pan American Games medalists in fencing
Pan American Games silver medalists for Canada
Fencers at the 1987 Pan American Games